Riku Heini (born 9 December 1990) is a Finnish football player currently playing for FC Lahti and Finland national under-19 football team.

References

External links
  Profile at veikkausliiga.com
  Profile at fclahti.fi

1990 births
Living people
Finnish footballers
FC Lahti players
Veikkausliiga players
Association football defenders
Association football midfielders
Sportspeople from Lahti